Charleston Township is a township in Lee County, Iowa, United States.

History
Charleston Township was organized in 1844.

References

Townships in Lee County, Iowa
Townships in Iowa